The Palace of Unity (Tajik: Кохи Ваҳдат/Kokhi Vahdat/کاخ وحدت), also referred to as Vahdat Palace, is a building in Dushanbe, Tajikistan. Located in the northern part of Dushanbe's main thoroughfare, Rudaki Avenue, near Hotel Avesto and the embassy of Uzbekistan, it is the headquarters of the ruling People's Democratic Party and is also used to host international conferences.

November 2007 bombing
In November 2007, a bomb was left in a plastic bag near a wall outside of the Palace. A 77-year-old man, variously reported to be a janitor, a street sweeper, or a security guard, was the only victim; he was killed at 08:10 on 14 November 2007 when he picked up the plastic bag containing the bomb, causing it to explode. The explosion also blew out many windows at the palace.

References

Office buildings in Tajikistan
Event venues in Tajikistan
Buildings and structures in Dushanbe
Headquarters of political parties